Senica District (okres Senica) is a district in the Trnava Region of western Slovakia. The district is relatively rich in natural resources oil, gas, lignite.  It is an industrial district, in the late period had been established here new industrial facilities. Senica District in its present borders had been established in 1996. Administrative, cultural, and economic center is its seat and largest town Senica. In Senica District is located spa Smrdáky and of cultural importance is also basilica in Šaštín.

Municipalities
 Bílkove Humence
 Borský Mikuláš
 Borský Svätý Jur
 Cerová
 Čáry
 Častkov
 Český Jánetý
 Dojč
 Hlboké
 Hradište pod Vrátnom
 Jablonica
 Koválov
 Kuklov
 Kúty
 Lakšárska Nová Ves
 Moravský Svätý Ján
 Osuské
 Plavecký Peter
 Podbranč
 Prietrž
 Prievaly
 Rohov
 Rovensko
 Rybky
 Sekule
 Senica
 Smolinské
 Smrdáky
 Sobotište
 Šajdíkove Humence
 Šaštín-Stráže
 Štefanov

References 

 
Districts of Slovakia